Catherine Janet Cavadini is an American voice actress.

Awards
In 1998, she was nominated for an Annie Award for "Outstanding Individual Achievement for Voice Acting by a Female Performer in an Animated Feature Production" for performing the voice and singing for the role of Mary in the animated movie Babes in Toyland. She also sang Dreams to Dream as the character Tanya Mousekewitz in the animated movie An American Tail: Fievel Goes West, which was nominated for Best Song at the 49th Golden Globe Awards. In addition, she has received 2 Emmy Award Certificates for contributing to Outstanding Sound on the TV series, The X-Files.

In 2003, Cavadini was honored with a White House Project Epic Award (which gives recognition to projects that promote women leadership) for her work in The Powerpuff Girls Movie as Blossom.

Partial filmography

Anime
Japan Sinks: 2020 – Kanae Murota  (credited as "Catherine Cavadini")

Film
All-Star Superman – Cat Grant and Floral
An American Tail: Fievel Goes West – Tanya Mousekewitz
Babes in Toyland – Mary, Nominated-Outstanding Individual Achievement for Voice Acting by a Female Performer in an Animated Feature Production
Batman: The Dark Knight Returns - Part 1 – Bruce's Pit Crew, Joannie, and Woman with Hot Dog
Cars 3 – Additional voices
Cats & Dogs: The Revenge of Kitty Galore – Christmas Lady
 Chernichaw's Go! Chase - Alice Chernichaw
Dinosaur – Various Lemurs
Final Fantasy: The Spirits Within – Various Phantoms
Finding Dory – Debbie
Ford v Ferrari - Additional voices
Garfield Gets Real – Daisy Girl
Garfield's Pet Force – Additional voices
The Grinch – Additional voices
Happy Feet and Happy Feet Two – Additional voices
Incredibles 2 – Welch, TV Anchor #1
It Was My Best Birthday Ever, Charlie Brown – Mimi (singing voice)
Jaws: The Revenge - Additional voices
Klaus - Additional voices: Adults (credited as "Catherine Cavadini")
Lilo & Stitch – Fainting Girl (credited as "Catherine Cavadini")
Love and Monsters - Additional Voices/Loop Group (credited as "Catherine Cavadini")
The Lion King – Lions
Minions: The Rise of Gru - Additional Voices
My Little Pony: The Movie – North Star
The Other End of the Line – Jennifer David, Priya Sethi's English-speaking voice (credited as "Special Voice Artist")
The Powerpuff Girls Movie – Blossom
Pound Puppies and the Legend of Big Paw – Charlamange, Collette
Puss in Boots – ADR Looper (credited as "Catherine Cavadini")
Ready Player One – IOI P.A.
Rise of the Guardians - ADR Looper (credited as "Catherine Cavadini")
Scooby-Doo! Legend of the Phantosaur – Faith
Sing  – Bunnies (credited as "Catherine Cavadini")
Soul - Dreamerwind
Spy - Additional voices
Starchaser: The Legend of Orin – Additional voices
The LEGO Batman Movie - ADR Looper (credited as "Catherine Cavadini")
The Simpsons Movie - ADR Looper (credited as "Catherine Cavadini")
Transformers: Age of Extinction - Female News Reporter
Wish Dragon - Additional voices (credited as "Catherine Cavadini")
Wonderful Days – Jay, Young Shua, and Cheyenne
Wonder Park – ADR Looper (credited as "Catherine Cavadini")

Television
Adventures from the Book of Virtues – Sarah West and Mother Snake (ep. "Friendship")
Back to the Future: The Animated Series – Jennifer Parker
The Batman – Wife, Movie Star and Reporter (ep. "The Big Chill")
Batman: The Brave and the Bold – Alanna Strange; Jan and Ruby Ryder (ep. "Bold Beginnings!"); Fiona and Dr. Myrra Rhodes (ep. "Four Star Spectacular")
Ben 10 – Cooper Daniels (ep. "Ben 10 vs. The Negative 10")
The Cleveland Show – Siri
Darkwing Duck – Additional voices (ep. "Time And Punishment")
Doc McStuffins – Dart
Duck Dodgers – Cheerleader (ep. "The Kids Are All Wrong/Win, Lose or Duck")
Duckman: Private Dick/Family Man – Paperboy, Blonde girl (ep. "All About Elliott")
Fievel's American Tails – Tanya Mousekewitz and Yasha Mousekewitz
Jackie Chan Adventures – Abila and Female Warrior (ep. "Lost City of the Muntabs")
Jem – Clash (aka Constance Montgomery)
Johnny Bravo – Sandy Baker (ep. "The Time of My Life")
Justice League – Doctor Mary and Blonde Girl (ep. "The Brave and the Bold")
Justice League Unlimited – Katie and Billy's Girlfriend (ep. "Dark Heart")
Kidd Video – Glitter
Kid Cosmic - Agent Pink
The Little Mermaid – Andrina
Michael Jackson's Halloween - Additional voices
Mister T – Skye Redfern (ep. "Mystery of the Forbidden Monastery")
My Life as a Teenage Robot – Singer and Girl #3 (ep. "A Robot for All Seasons")
My Little Pony – Ariel (ep. "Flight to Cloud Castle")
Peter Pan and the Pirates – Cecilia (ep. "Hook's Christmas")
The Powerpuff Girls – Blossom
 The New Adventures of Sheldon - Alice Chernichaw
Teen Titans – Alien Woman / Chrysalis Hunter (ep. "Transformation")
Spider-Man & His Amazing Friends – Ariel (ep. "Spidey Meets the Girl From Tomorrow")
Superman – Additional voices (ep. "Bonechill/The Driver's License")
The What-A-Cartoon! Show – Blossom (Meat Fuzzy Lumpkins and Crime 101)
What's with Andy? (Season 1) – Mrs. Frieda Larkin, Teri, and Mrs. Weebles

Video games
Broken Age – Car'l, Twyla, Candle Maiden
Cartoon Network Racing – Blossom
Cartoon Network: Punch Time Explosion XL – Blossom
Dishonored 2 – Aristocrats
Final Fantasy VII Remake – Jessie's Mother
Final Fantasy X – Calli the Chocobo Attendant, Additional voices
Final Fantasy XIII – Cocoon Inhabitants
Final Fantasy XIII-2 – Additional voices
FusionFall – Blossom
The Golden Compass – Valla the Witch of the Tundra, Bolvangar Nurse, and Tartar Leopard
Gun – Sadie
Happy Feet – Norma Jean, Human #1, Young Penguin #1
Iron and the Maiden – Angel and John Chase Jr.
Jumper: Griffin's Story – Griffin's Mom, Dr. Hoffstader, and Assassin
Lego The Incredibles – Brainfreezer, Additional voices (credited as "Catherine Cavadini")
Lost Odyssey – Additional voices
The Powerpuff Girls: Chemical X-traction – Blossom
The Powerpuff Girls: Relish Rampage – Blossom
Warhammer Online: Wrath of Heroes – Felicia
White Knight Chronicles and White Knight Chronicles II – Kara
WildStar – Mechari Female

References

External links

Living people
American video game actresses
American voice actresses
20th-century American actresses
21st-century American actresses
Year of birth missing (living people)